Tim Sale may refer to:

 Tim Sale (artist) (1956–2022), comic book artist
 Tim Sale (politician) (born 1942), Canadian politician